Theological College is the national Catholic diocesan seminary for the Latin Church in the United States. The school was founded in 1917 and is located in Washington, D.C. It is affiliated with the Catholic University of America and is owned and administered by priests of the Society of Saint-Sulpice.

It is located near the campus of CUA, across from the Basilica of the National Shrine of the Immaculate Conception, and close to other Brookland-area Catholic institutions such as Capuchin College, the house of the Missionary Oblates of Mary Immaculate, and the Dominican House of Studies. The larger neighborhood is for this reason referred to as "Little Rome".

History
In 1889, priests belonging to the Society of Saint Sulpice were asked to administer the divinity college of the Catholic University of America. In 1917, they began building their own seminary next to the university. The Sulpician Seminary was first run as an extension of Saint Mary Seminary in Baltimore, Maryland, but became an independent institution in 1924. In 1940, the Catholic University school of theology assumed responsibility for training its seminarians, whereupon the seminary was renamed Theological College.

Sulpician tradition
The formation program of Theological College is guided by the principles and ethos of the Sulpician Fathers as articulated by Father Jean-Jacques Olier, founder of the Society of St. Sulpice: “to live supremely for God in Christ Jesus our Lord, so much so that the inner life of His only Son should penetrate to the inmost depths of our heart and to such an extent that everyone should be able to say ‘It is no longer I who live, but Christ who lives in me.'” Founded to reform the clergy in 1630s France, the Society retains its commitment of “developing men of character, educating effective priests, forming pastoral leaders and nurturing an apostolic spirit.”

The Society’s five hallmarks are a commitment to ministerial priesthood, the cultivation of an apostolic spirit, an emphasis on spiritual formation, the creation of a formational community, and the exercise of collegiality.

This approach gives special emphasis and recognition to the importance of mental prayer and spiritual direction. Particular devotion to Our Lady under the title Sedes Sapientiae, Seat of Wisdom, is another distinctive characteristic.

Academic programs
The Order of Saint-Sulpice focuses on training priests through its seminaries. To that end, the Theological College provides priestly formation through three separate academic programs: a two-year certified pre-theology program; a theology program; and the Basselin scholars program for undergraduate-level seminarians. The latter, an eponymous endowed scholarship of Theodore B. Basselin, is administered by the Catholic University school of philosophy and students complete both a BA and an MA in Philosophy through this program.

The theology program at Theological College offers three degree tracks for prospective seminarians: an S.T.B./M.Div. program, an S.T.B./S.T.L. program adding an extra year of studies after priestly ordination, and an S.T.B./J.C.L. program adding two extra years of study after priestly ordination. 

The seminary houses and forms seminarians from the following dioceses: Charleston, Cleveland, Corpus Christi, Dallas, Fort Worth, Harrisburg, Lafayette, Louisville, Memphis, New York, Pittsburgh, Portland, Richmond, Rockville Centre, Salt Lake City, Santa Fe, St. Augustine, Syracuse, Washington, and Worcester.

Rectors

Faculty
The seventeenth and current rector of Theological College is the Reverend Dominic G. Ciriaco, PSS, M.A., M. Div., D. Min. (cand.), who assumed this position in October, 2020. He succeeded the Very Reverend Gerald D McBrearity, PSS, S.T.B., D.Min., M.A., who served as rector from 2016 to 2020. The current vice-rector is Reverend Chris Arockiaraj, PSS, M.S., S.T.B., Ph.L., Ph.D., D. Min., The faculty includes five other priests, four of whom are Sulpicians, who are appointed by the Sulpician Provincial Council, one permanent deacon, and one Capuchin Friar. The position of rector must be approved by both the president of the Catholic University and the archbishop of Washington.

Notable alumni
Theological College is the alma mater of over 1,500 priests, including 45 bishops and six cardinals. These include:
Cardinal Joseph Bernardin
Cardinal Raymond Leo Burke (B.A., 1970; M.A., 1971)
Cardinal Daniel DiNardo (B.A., M.A.)
Cardinal James Aloysius Hickey
Cardinal Humberto Sousa Medeiros
Cardinal Donald Wuerl (B.A., 1962; M.A., 1963)
Archbishop Philip Hannan (M.A.)
Bishop Robert Barron
Bishop Martin Holley
Bishop William Clifford Newman
Bishop Michael Fors Olson  (B.A., 1988; M.A., 1989)
Bishop Mitchell T. Rozanski
Monsignor Stephen Joseph Rossetti
Monsignor John F. Wippel (B.A., 1955; M.A., 1956)
Father Raymond E. Brown, S.S. (B.A., 1948; M.A. 1949)

References

External links

Edgewood (Washington, D.C.)
Colleges and schools of the Catholic University of America
Educational institutions established in 1917
Roman Catholic Archdiocese of Washington
Catholic seminaries in the United States
Seminaries and theological colleges in Washington, D.C.
Society of the Priests of Saint Sulpice
1917 establishments in Washington, D.C.